The Committee to Form a Libertarian Party was the precursor to the modern United States Libertarian Party.  It was formed to debate the desirability of a specifically libertarian political force.  The committee was founded July 17, 1971 by David Nolan, a Colorado consultant and businessman, and 4 friends to co-ordinate interest in founding a Libertarian Party in the United States.

It was, according to one outreach brochure, preceded by several abortive attempts, including a Libertarian Party in California and a functional Libertarian group in Florida.  The Florida Libertarian Party (founded in 1970) achieved an early Libertarian victory, a popular initiative.

On December 11, 1971, the eight-member Committee to Organize a Libertarian Party voted to formally launch the new Libertarian Party. The committee was immediately dissolved and replaced by the Steering Committee, which had its first meeting immediately after, which in turn was superseded by the National Executive Committee with the first national convention in 1972.

References

External links
 Minutes of final meeting of the committee
 Libertarian Party of the U.S.
  Libertarian Party Florida
 International Society for Individual Liberty

Libertarian Party (United States)
1971 establishments in the United States
1971 disestablishments in the United States